The European route E99 or E99 is a European road running from Dəmirçi, Azerbaijan to Akçakale in Turkey on Syrian border.

Route 

: Dəmirçi

: Aralık - Iğdır
: Iğdır - Doğubeyazıt - Muradiye
: Muradiye - Erciş
: Erciş - Heybeli
: Heybeli - Tatvan - Bitlis - Ziyaret
: Ziyaret - Diyarbakır - Siverek
: Siverek - Şanlıurfa - Akçakale

 
 Route 712: Tell Abyad

External links 
 UN Economic Commission for Europe: Overall Map of E-road Network (2007)

99
E099